John Renham (or Reigham) was an English medieval university chancellor.

Renham was chancellor of the University of Oxford between 1358 and 1359. He may also have served as chancellor of the university in 1363.

References

Year of birth unknown
Year of death unknown
Chancellors of the University of Oxford
14th-century English people